Gianpiero Lambiase, often known as GP, is an Italian-British Formula One engineer. He is currently the race engineer for Max Verstappen at the Red Bull Racing Formula One team.

Career
Lambiase started his Formula 1 career in 2005 with Jordan and worked with the Silverstone outfit through its numerous guises for 10 years. In 2008 he worked as a performance engineer for Giancarlo Fisichella guiding the Italian to Force India's first pole position and podium in Belgium 2009.

In 2010 he then became a race engineer for Vitantonio Liuzzi and when the Italian left at the end of that season, he took the same position for Paul di Resta. He worked with di Resta for three years, who was replaced by Sergio Pérez in 2014. After working with Pérez for one season, Lambiase moved to Red Bull Racing.

At Red Bull he joined Daniil Kvyat as a racing engineer in 2015 and maintained his position when Kvyat was replaced by Verstappen. In his current role as race engineer he is responsible for all trackside communications to the driver and the set up of the Formula One car. Lambiase is known for being extremely direct and precise in his communications on the radio which Verstappen has frequently praised.

In 2022 Lambiase took over as Head of Race Engineering from Guillaume Rocquelin for Red Bull, while also retaining his role as race engineer for Verstappen.

References 

Living people
Formula One engineers
British motorsport people
Red Bull Racing
Year of birth missing (living people)
English people of Italian descent